Archbishopric of Belgrade may refer to:

 Serbian Orthodox Archbishopric of Belgrade, central archdiocese of Serbian Orthodox Metropolitanate of Belgrade from 1831 to 1920.
 Roman Catholic Archbishopric of Belgrade, central archdiocese of Roman Catholic Church in Serbia.

See also
 Archbishop of Belgrade (disambiguation)
 Archdiocese of Belgrade (disambiguation)
 Metropolitanate of Belgrade (disambiguation)
 Eastern Orthodoxy in Serbia
 Catholic Church in Serbia